René Jean-Louis Célestin Abadie (13 August 1935 – 11 July 1996) was a French cyclist. He competed in the individual and team road race events at the 1956 Summer Olympics. He participated at 1962 Tour de France in the Mercier Team.

References

External links
 

1935 births
1996 deaths
French male cyclists
Olympic cyclists of France
Cyclists at the 1956 Summer Olympics
Sportspeople from Haute-Garonne
Cyclists from Occitania (administrative region)